Vårberg is a station in the Stockholm metro in the neighbourhood Vårberg in Söderort, Stockholm Municipality. The station was opened on 2 December 1967 as the south terminus of an extension from Skärholmen. On 1 October 1972, the line was extended to Fittja. Vårberg is part of Line 13 of the Red Line.

As part of Art in the Stockholm metro project, the station features ceramic wall works entitled In our hands, created by Maria Ängquist Klyvare in 1996.

References

Red line (Stockholm metro) stations
Railway stations opened in 1967